Edvard Möller (Edvard Carl Möller 13 February 1888 – 23 June 1920) was a Swedish athlete who competed in the 1912 Summer Olympics. In 1912 he finished fifth in the standing long jump competition. In the standing high jump event he finished fourth.

References

External links 
 Profile at sports-reference.com
 Profile at the Sveriges Olympiska Kommitté

1888 births
1920 deaths
Swedish male high jumpers
Swedish male long jumpers
Olympic athletes of Sweden
Athletes (track and field) at the 1912 Summer Olympics
20th-century Swedish people